Vegar Heggenes Gjermundstad (born 14 March 1990) is a Norwegian football defender who plays for Førde IL.

Career
He hails from Vadheim. He started his career in Vadheim IL and IL Høyang, but moved in 2006 to attend the school Norsk Toppidrettsgymnas as well as to play for FC Lyn Oslo. In the summer of 2008 he signed for Lyn's senior team. He has two Norwegian Premier League games in 2009, making his debut on 19 April 2009 against Strømsgodset and starting his first game on 3 May 2009 against Stabæk Fotball. His 27th and last game came in May 2010. Following the bankruptcy of Lyn, he joined Sogndal IL in July 2010.

References

External links

1990 births
Living people
Norwegian footballers
Lyn Fotball players
Sogndal Fotball players
Hønefoss BK players
People from Høyanger
Association football defenders
Sportspeople from Vestland